The NW type J is a veteran automobile manufactured by Nesselsdorfer Wagenbau-Fabriks-Gesellschaft A.G. ("NW", now known as "Tatra"). Two basic versions are recognized - the initial "J (30)" with a 30 HP engine, and the later "J (40)" with a 40 HP engine. As well as types "K" and "L", it had upright four-cylinder engines of side-valve design. The engines in the three types were rather heavy, 4 to 5 liters.

The car was able to reach a speed of 80 km/h.

References

Cars of the Czech Republic
Tatra vehicles
Cars introduced in 1902
Rear-wheel-drive vehicles